The Ithaca Bombers football program is a college football team that represents Ithaca College in the Empire 8, a part of the Division III (NCAA).  The team has had 10 head coaches since its first recorded football game in 1930. The current coach is Michael Toerper who first took the position for the 2022 season.

Key

Coaches
Statistics correct as of the end of the 2021 college football season.

Notes

References

Ithaca Bombers

Lists of sportspeople from New York (state)
Ithaca Bombers football coaches